Silvermines GAA is a Gaelic Athletic Association (GAA) club in County Tipperary, Ireland. It plays hurling, camogie, Gaelic football and handball at county level and in the North division of Tipperary GAA. Under 12 county a final in 2015

Hurling

Honours
 Munster Intermediate Club Hurling Championship 
 2012
 Tipperary Intermediate Hurling Championship:
 1972, 1999, 2012
 North Tipperary Senior Hurling Championship:
 1974
 North Tipperary Intermediate Hurling Championship:
 1945, 1948, 1972, 1987, 1994, 1997, 1998, 1999, 2006, 2011, 2012

Notable players
 Jason Forde
 Noel Sheehy, Tipperary hurler 1986-97
 Páidraig O'Ríain 1981
Jim Keogh 1973-1985

Camogie

Notable players
 Noelle Kennedy, five times All-Ireland medallist

Facilities
The club's grounds are situated in Dolla, approximately 6 km from Nenagh.

The facilities at the grounds include two full sized GAA pitches, a juvenile pitch, 40x20 handball alley and a hurling wall. The main pitch is separated from the remainder of the grounds and has a spectator stand, viewing slopes, sideline seating, dugouts and scoreboard. Entry to this pitch is by way of turnstiles which are situated in a building which also incorporates a shop and a medical room.

In recent years the venue has accommodated divisional and county finals at various grades, including Junior, U-21 and Minor levels. It is also used as a venue for schools and colleges matches.

References

External links
Official Site
Tipperary GAA site

Gaelic games clubs in County Tipperary
Hurling clubs in County Tipperary